Roio is a frazione of L'Aquila in the Abruzzo.

Roio may also refer to:

 Roio del Sangro, a village and comune of the province of Chieti in the Abruzzo
 Roio Piano, a frazione of L'Aquila in the Abruzzo, region of Italy

See also 
 Rojo  (disambiguation)
 Royo